The Paterson House is a historic residence in Mobile, Alabama, United States.  The  Mediterranean Revival style house was completed in 1927.  It was designed by local architect Platt Roberts, who later designed Mobile's 16-story Waterman Building. It was added to the National Register of Historic Places on May 15, 1986, based on its architectural significance.

References

National Register of Historic Places in Mobile, Alabama
Houses on the National Register of Historic Places in Alabama
Houses in Mobile, Alabama
Mediterranean Revival architecture in Alabama
Houses completed in 1927
Platt Roberts buildings